Cerro Colorado is Spanish for red mountain/hill. It may refer to:

North America
 Cerro Colorado (Baja California), mountain in Tijuana, Mexico
 Cerro Colorado (borough), Tijuana, Baja California, Mexico
 Cerro Colorado, Arizona, a ghost town in Arizona, U.S.
 Cerro Colorado Mountains, a mountain range in Arizona, U.S.

South America

 Cerro Colorados, a mountain in Argentina
 Cerros Colorados Complex, in Neuquén, Argentina
 Cerro Colorado (volcano), a volcano in Chile
 Cerro Colorado Formation, west of Chile Chico in Chilean Patagonia
 Cerro Colorado District, a district in Arequipa, Peru
 Cerro Colorado, a burial site of the Paracas culture in Peru; see 
 Cerro Colorado, officially Alejandro Gallinal, in Uruguay